To ximeroma tou erota (Greek: Το ξημέρωμα του έρωτα; The dawn of love) is a studio album by popular Greek singer Marinella. It was released in 1993 by Minos EMI in Greece. This album was issued in mono and stereo. The stereo version of this album was released on CD in the same year.

Track listing 

Side One.
 "Anatolika tis dysis" (Ανατολικά της δύσης) – (Thanasis Polykandriotis – Ifigeneia Giannopoulou) – 3:53
 "To ximeroma tou erota" (Το ξημέρωμα του έρωτα) – (Thanasis Polykandriotis – Ifigeneia Giannopoulou) – 3:37
 "Tris i ora" (Τρεις η ώρα) – (Thanasis Polykandriotis – Ifigeneia Giannopoulou) – 3:18
 "Olos o kosmos kegiete" (Όλος ο κόσμος καίγεται) – (Thanasis Polykandriotis – Ifigeneia Giannopoulou) – 3:11
 "Rodo ki agkathi" (Ρόδο κι αγκάθι) – (Thanasis Polykandriotis – Ifigeneia Giannopoulou) – 4:04
 "Anasa sto avrio" (Ανάσα στο αύριο) – (Thanasis Polykandriotis – Ifigeneia Giannopoulou) – 3:06
 "Ti ekana gia parti mou" (Τι έκανα για πάρτη μου) – (Thanasis Polykandriotis – Fotini Dourou) – 3:18
Side Two.
 "M' enan erota echtro" (Μ' έναν έρωτα εχθρό) – (Christos Nikolopoulos – Ifigeneia Giannopoulou) – 4:02
 "Gia na niosis san Theos" (Για να νιώσεις σαν Θεός) – (Christos Nikolopoulos – Ifigeneia Giannopoulou) – 3:53
 "Ego" (Εγώ) – (Christos Nikolopoulos – Ifigeneia Giannopoulou) – 3:02
 "O,ti zo meta apo 'sena" (Ό,τι ζω μετά από 'σένα) – (Christos Nikolopoulos – Ifigeneia Giannopoulou) – 3:05
 "Pseftiko stoma" (Ψεύτικο στόμα) – (Christos Nikolopoulos – Ifigeneia Giannopoulou) – 3:27
 "Matia anatolis" (Μάτια ανατολής) – (Christos Nikolopoulos – Ifigeneia Giannopoulou) – 2:57

Personnel 
 Marinella – vocals
 Argyris Koukas – background vocals on tracks 4, 7 and 12
 Stelios Goulielmos, Eva Tselidou, Sandy Politi – background vocals
 Haris Andreadis – arranger, conductor
 Minos EMI – producer
 Philippos Papatheodorou – art direction
 Yiannis Smyrneos – recording engineer
 Dinos Diamantopoulos – photographer
 Dimitris Souleles – hair stylist

References

1993 albums
Marinella albums
Greek-language albums
Minos EMI albums